Compsodrillia gonae is a species of sea snail, a marine gastropod mollusk in the family Pseudomelatomidae, the turrids and allies.

Description
The length of the shell varies between 8 mm and 12 mm.

Distribution
This marine species occurs off the Dutch Antilles and Brazil.

References

 De Jong K.M. & Coomans H.E. (1988) Marine gastropods from Curaçao, Aruba and Bonaire. Leiden: E.J. Brill. 261 pp.

External links
 
 

gonae
Gastropods described in 1988